Kitchen is an unincorporated community in Madison Township, Jackson County, Ohio, United States.

The Kitchen Post Office was established on March 6, 1883, and discontinued on December 30, 1922. Mail service is now handled through the Oak Hill branch.

References 

Unincorporated communities in Jackson County, Ohio